Milewski, Milevsky, Milevski or Miļevskis is a surname which appears in many countries in various forms:

People
Alina Milevska (born 1995), Ukrainian figure skater
Andrey Milewski (born 1977), Belarusian football player
Artem Milevskyi (born 1985), Ukrainian footballer
Blagoja Milevski (born 1971), Macedonian football manager and former player
Dmitry Milevsky (born 1991), Russian football player
Elizabeta Kancheska-Milevska (born 1970), Macedonian politician
Jakub Milewski, Polish Catholic priest
Jevgeņijs Miļevskis (born 1961), Latvian football striker
Jürgen Milewski (born 1957), German footballer
Ksenia Milevskaya (born 1990), Belarusian tennis player
Moshe Milevsky, American academician and author
Nikodem Milewski, Austrian music producer
Paweł Milewski (born 1975), Polish diplomat
Sebastian Milewski (born 1998), Polish footballer
Tadeusz Milewski (1906–1966), Polish linguist
Milewski's typology, a language classification system
 Terry Milewski (born 1949), Canadian journalist
Witold Milewski (1817–1889), Polish mathematician, physicist, and pedagogue
Yevgeny Milevsky (born 1995), Belarusian football player
Zygmunt Milewski (1934–2002), Polish Boxer

See also
 
 Milevska planina, a mountain in Bulgaria and Serbia 

Polish-language surnames